Q-Ball: Billiards Master, known in Japan as , and in Europe as Pool Master, is a video game developed by Ornith and published by ASK and Take-Two Interactive for the PlayStation 2 in 2000-2001. It is the sequel to the 1998 video game Pool Hustler, which was released for PlayStation.

The game's working title was Cool Pool Billiards Master, which was originally set to be released on November 26, 2000, one month after the launch of the PlayStation 2. However, Take-Two Interactive launched its new website for the game while changing its name to Q-Ball: Billiards Master, but why the release date was changed back to October 26 is unclear.

Reception

The game received "mixed" reviews according to the review aggregation website Metacritic. Mike Wolf of NextGen said, "We wouldn't label this a must-buy, but it's certainly worth a look." In Japan, Famitsu gave it a score of 29 out of 40.

References

External links
 

2000 video games
Cue sports video games
PlayStation 2 games
PlayStation 2-only games
Take-Two Interactive games
Video game sequels
Video games developed in Japan